Kur-e Kelkian (also Romanized as Kūr-e Kelkīān; also known as Karīmābād and Kūr-e Kelkelīān) is a village in Howmeh Rural District, in the Central District of Iranshahr County, Sistan and Baluchestan Province, Iran. At the 2006 census, its population was 765, in 164 families.

References 

Populated places in Iranshahr County